The 1991 Arizona Wildcats softball team represented the University of Arizona in the 1991 NCAA Division I softball season.  The Wildcats were coached by Mike Candrea, who led his sixth season.  The Wildcats finished with a record of 56–16.  They competed in the Pacific-10 Conference, where they finished fourth with a 11–9 record.

The Wildcats were invited to the 1991 NCAA Division I softball tournament, where they swept the West Regional and then completed a run through the Women's College World Series to claim their first NCAA Women's College World Series Championship and first women's team championship in school history.  This title would start a run of eight WCWS championships over seventeen seasons and lead to recognition as one of the top programs in the nation.

Roster

Schedule

References

Arizona
Arizona Wildcats softball seasons
Arizona Softball
Women's College World Series seasons
NCAA Division I softball tournament seasons